Kerrie Kelly is a chief executive and former lawyer from Australia. She has held the positions of chief executive officer of the Insurance Council of Australia (2006-2010) and chief executive officer of the Financial Planning Association of Australia (2003-2006).

Life 
Kelly was admitted to the bar in Victoria, Australia, in 1978 and began her career as a commercial and corporate lawyer, followed by a promotion to General Counsel. She then moved into corporate leadership positions, including positions with the Australian Physiotherapy Council (2013), the Association of British Insurers (2010), the ASX Perpetual Registrars Ltd, the Trustee Corporations Association (1997-2001), Roads & Traffic Authority of New South Wales. She has held director positions for HSBC Bank Australia, Financial Literacy Advisory Board, Financial Ombudsman Service, Finance Industry Council of Australia, National Finance Industry Training Advisory Body and Westmead Medical Research Foundation. Kelly was also a member of the NSW and ACT Advisory Council for Committee for Economic Development of Australia.

References

Living people
Year of birth missing (living people)
Australian women lawyers
21st-century Australian lawyers
20th-century Australian lawyers
Australian chief executives
20th-century women lawyers
21st-century women lawyers
20th-century Australian women